Peket, also pékèt or pèket is an eau de vie (fruit brandy) aromatised with juniper berries, similar to Dutch gin. The drink originates from Belgium and its name is derived from the Walloon word for juniper.

Etymology
The word “peket” means “prickly” in old Walloon. Other sources tell that this word was used by miners. It certainly comes from the Walloon word “pèke”, which means juniper berry in some Walloon regions. This name was used afterwards in Wallonia, for an eau de vie aromatised with these berries.

Peket is a grain alcohol distilled in the region of the river Meuse from Maastricht to Namur. It is aromatised with the juniper berries that give this special taste such appreciated by the connoisseurs who drink it on rocks.

Folklore

Peket is commonly consumed during the celebrations of August 15 in the Outremeuse quarter of Liège and also during the Walloon Festivities that takes place every year in Namur.

Several local recipes use peket, for example quail and duck are sometimes cooked with it. Smoked fish or strong cheese, such as Herve cheese are popular accompaniments.

Peket is traditionally sold in one-litre clay bottles, but some sell it in glass bottles. It is sometimes mixed with Coca-Cola to produce a cocktail known as "white coke".

Belgian alcoholic drinks